The Chocha Ngacha language or Chochangachakha (  "'You' and 'I' language"; also called "Kursmad-kha", "Maphekha", "rTsamangpa'i kha", and "Tsagkaglingpa'i kha") or Tsamang is a Southern Tibetic language spoken by about 20,000 people in the Kurichu Valley of Lhuntse and Mongar Districts in eastern Bhutan.

Chocha Ngacha and Dzongkha
Chocha Ngacha is a "sister language" to Dzongkha. Under pressure to assimilate into the mainstream Dzongkha-speaking Ngalop culture, this proximity has resulted in significant loss of its particularly distinctive Kurichu linguistic substrate.
Nicholas Tournadre writes:

See also
Dzongkha
Languages of Bhutan
Language shift

References 

Languages of Bhutan
South Bodish languages
Languages written in Tibetan script